Kwa River may refer to
Kwa Ibo River, which runs through Abia State and Akwa Ibom State, Nigeria
Great Kwa River, in Cross River State, Nigeria
Kwah River, the short stretch of the Kasai River from the inflow of the Fimi to the Congo
Kwa Kwa River, which connects the Sanaga River to the Wouri Estuary in Cameroon